The 40 Principles of  invention are a suite of ideas that purport to aid in solving hard technical problems.

The principles are based on TRIZ, a theory about problem solving. They are used together with Contradiction Matrices.

Contradiction matrix 

A Contradiction Matrix is a structured and systematic representation of basic engineering parameters of objects, or systems, such as weight, length and manufacturing tolerances.

TRIZ 
TRIZ claims that by studying an individual parameter that is causing a problem (e.g., the weight of an object needs to be reduced), and the other parameters with which it conflicts (e.g., the lower weight would require thinner material, which is more likely to undergo catastrophic failure), solutions can be created.

And this is actually the simplification of some fact. Namely, the structured contents of each of the cells within the Contradiction Matrix, (i.e. cells fulfilled with ordered principles and identified by their order numbers) - the principles of inventions have been chosen, due to realized necessary statistical extensive studies.

History 
Studies led by G. S. Altshuller led to this approach.

According to Altshuller, every technical problem that requires a solution can be categorized in terms of what he called its Main Technical Contradiction. 

Altshuller proposed that the process of evolution of any given System is ruled by general 'Laws of Systems Evolution'. One such law says that the process of finding the solution can be facilitated by forming analogies to solutions that had already been found for another technical problem. However, the main point is to acquire the necessary experience in correctly defining the Main Technical Contradiction.

References

External links
Interactive matrix proposing the 40 principles
List and uses of the 40 principles

TRIZ